Plus jeden deň is a daily newspaper in Slovak published by the company News and Media Holding. The literal translation of the title is Plus One Day.

History
The company Spoločnosť 7 Plus was started in 1990 by three individuals from Slovakia. The paper was established in September 2006. It is one of multiple publications by the company including Plus 7 dní, Šarm, and Báječná žena.

On 28 March 2008, Plus jeden deň protested against a law which it said would curb freedom of the press by publishing a paper with its front page blank except for a summary of criticisms of the proposed regulation. The legislation arose out of a European Union treaty and was controversial when proposed in the parliament in Slovakia. When the law passed, the paper again printed a blank front page on 11 April 2008, save for a few lines which stated: "Dear readers, the parliament passed a media law that severely hits press freedom and editorial independence. It aims against the interests of the citizens and readers." The paper criticized that the law, which mandated publication of reader opinions, would flood the media to the point of creating laborious inefficiencies.

Reception
In his book Media Law in Slovakia, author Andrej Školkay called Plus jeden deň part of, "the second most important media house" in Slovakia. Peter Barrer wrote in an article for the Journal of New Zealand & Pacific Studies that it was among "Slovakia's foremost print media outlets".

See also

List of newspapers in Slovakia
List of Slovak films
List of Slovak television series
Telecommunications in Slovakia

References

Further reading

External links

Plus Jeden Den, Newspaper ranking and review

2006 establishments in Slovakia
Mass media in Bratislava
Newspapers published in Slovakia
Publications established in 2006
Slovak-language newspapers